(Dates in italics indicate de facto continuation of office)

For continuation after independence, see: President of Chad

See also
Chad
Heads of state of Chad
Heads of government of Chad
Lists of office-holders

Political history of Chad
Chad
Chad history-related lists